Khalil Ahmed (1936–1997) was a Pakistani film composer.

Khalil Ahmed or Ahmad may also refer to:

 Khalil Ahmad (politician), Pakistani politician
 Khalil Ahmad (basketball) (born 1996), American basketball player
 Khaleel Ahmed (born 1997), Indian cricketer
 Bano Khalil Ahmed (born 1969), Pakistani politician

See also
 Ahmed Khalil (disambiguation)